Carlos Menchaca (born September 11, 1980) is an American politician who served as a member of the New York City Council for the 38th district. He is a Democrat. His district included the Brooklyn neighborhoods of Sunset Park, Red Hook, Greenwood Heights, and portions of Borough Park, Dyker Heights, and Windsor Terrace. In October 2020, Menchaca declared his candidacy in the 2021 New York City Democratic mayoral primary, but suspended his campaign in March 2021, three months before the primary.

Early life and education
Menchaca was born and raised in El Paso, Texas. The first in his family to attend college, he earned a Bachelor of Arts degree from the University of San Francisco, where he studied performing arts and social justice.

Career 
Prior to assuming office, Menchaca worked in the Brooklyn Borough President's Office, as Marty Markowitz’s Capital Budget and Policy Coordinator from 2005 to 2011. From 2011 to 2013, Menchaca served as a liaison to the LGBT and HIV/AIDS community for the Office of the Speaker in the New York City Council.

Menchaca, along with Councilman Brad Lander, was arrested in January of 2015 at a rally for carwash workers.

New York City Council
In the 2013 election, Menchaca defeated incumbent Sara M. Gonzalez in the Democratic primary for District 38 in the New York City Council, which includes a portion of Brooklyn. He won the seat in the general election on November 5, 2013. Upon his election, Menchaca became the first Mexican-American elected to public office in New York City, and the first openly gay New York City Council member from Brooklyn.

Menchaca has been criticized for derailing redevelopment of the South Brooklyn Marine Terminal. In July 2020, Menchaca said he "strongly opposes" plans to rezone and redevelop Industry City. Due to City Council customs, Menchaca had the power to effectively end the project.

Menchaca chaired the Immigration Committee in the City Council and serves on the following committees: Recovery & Resiliency, Small Business, Standards & Ethics, General Welfare, and Transportation. He formerly served as the Chairman of the Brooklyn Council delegation.

2021 mayoral campaign 

On October 9, 2020, Menchaca registered a campaign with the New York City Campaign Finance Board and released a statement on social media about a potential run for mayor in the 2021 New York City Democratic mayoral primary. On October 22, he posted a video on his Twitter account officially announcing his candidacy for mayor. As of mid-January 2021, Menchaca had raised approximately $62,000 from donors, spent $48,000 on his campaign, and had about $14,500 left. Menchaca ended his campaign on March 24, 2021 and later endorsed Andrew Yang for Mayor.

Election results

See also
 LGBT culture in New York City
 List of LGBT people from New York City

References

External links
Carlos Menchaca - New York City Council
 Carlos Menchaca on Twitter
 Carlos Menchaca on Instagram
 Endorsement by the Victory Fund

Gay politicians
American LGBT city council members
People from El Paso, Texas
American politicians of Mexican descent
LGBT people from New York (state)
New York City Council members
1980 births
LGBT Hispanic and Latino American people
LGBT people from Texas
Living people
21st-century American politicians
New York (state) Democrats
21st-century LGBT people
Candidates in the 2021 United States elections